Bersyl Obassi (born 29 March 1996) is a Congolese professional footballer who plays as a midfielder for the Congo national team.

Club career
In February 2022, he joined Bourj in the Lebanese Premier League, ahead of the second leg of the 2021–22 season.

International career
In January 2014, coach Claude Leroy, invited him to be a part of the Congo squad for the 2014 African Nations Championship.
 The team was eliminated in the group stages after losing to Ghana, drawing with Libya and defeating Ethiopia.

References

External links
 
 

1996 births
Living people
Republic of the Congo footballers
Association football midfielders
CSMD Diables Noirs players
Stade Tunisien players
Bourj FC players
Lebanese Premier League players
Republic of the Congo international footballers
Republic of the Congo A' international footballers
2014 African Nations Championship players
Republic of the Congo expatriate footballers
Republic of the Congo expatriate sportspeople in Morocco
Republic of the Congo expatriate sportspeople in Tunisia
Republic of the Congo expatriate sportspeople in Lebanon
Expatriate footballers in Morocco
Expatriate footballers in Tunisia
Expatriate footballers in Lebanon
2018 African Nations Championship players
2020 African Nations Championship players